Sithalapathy Muktheeswarar Temple
(சிதலப்பதி முத்தீசுவரர் கோயில்])is a Hindu temple located at Sethalapathy in Tiruvarur district, Tamil Nadu, India. The presiding deity is Shiva. He is called as Muktheeswarar.  His consort is known as Porkodi Nayagi.

Significance 
It is one of the shrines of the 275 Paadal Petra Sthalams - Shiva Sthalams glorified in the early medieval Tevaram poems by Tamil Saivite Nayanar Tirugnanasambandar.

Literary Mention 

Tirugnanasambandar the feature of the deity as:

References

External links 
 
 

Shiva temples in Tiruvarur district
Padal Petra Stalam